Saad Tedjar (born January 14, 1986 in Béjaïa) is an Algerian footballer who is currently playing for ASO Chlef in the Algerian Ligue Professionnelle 1.

Club career
In 2006, Tedjar signed a five-year contract with Paradou AC.

JS Kabylie
In June 2009, Tedjar was loaned out by his club to JS Kabylie for one season with a buy option at the end of the loan period, on condition that Paradou AC do not gain promotion.

In his first season with the club, Tedjar scored 3 goals in 23 games as JSK finished third in the league.

On June 4, 2010, JS Kabylie took up the buy option on Tedjar, and the player signed a two-year contract with the club.

On August 29, 2010, he scored a goal against Egypt's Al Ahly in the 2010 CAF Champions League group stage, helping his side become the first team to earn a semi-final spot after drawing 1-1.

International career
On April 18, 2010, Tedjar made his debut for the Algeria A' national team as a substitute in an African Championship of Nations qualifier against Libya.

On August 12, 2011, Tedjar was called up for the first time to the Algerian National Team by Vahid Halilhodžić for a 2012 Africa Cup Nations qualifier against Tanzania.

Honours
 Won the Algerian Cup twice with JS Kabylie in 2011 and USM Alger in 2013

References

External links
 
 

1986 births
Living people
Footballers from Béjaïa
Algerian footballers
Algeria A' international footballers
Algeria international footballers
Algerian Ligue Professionnelle 1 players
JS Kabylie players
Paradou AC players
USM Alger players
ASO Chlef players
Kabyle people
2013 Africa Cup of Nations players
Association football midfielders
21st-century Algerian people